Shri B. M. Patil Medical College  is situated at Solapur road in Bijapur, Karnataka. It was declared a university under Section 3 of the UGC Act 1956, and approved by the Ministry of Human Resource Development. The college offers educational courses in medicine and surgery leading to MBBS degree. The college was established in the year 1986. The college has a well equipped hospital attached to it.

Research 
Research is carried out through national and international funded projects. Depression Brain Bank is in function. The medical college is having Centre for Advanced Medical Research, Laboratory of Vascular Physiology and Medicine,  Genetics Laboratory and Centre for Yoga and Exercise Sciences. These centers and laboratory provides all the research facilities from basic medical sciences to clinical medicine. It runs several clinical trials with Indian and International collaborations. Parent University of the medical college - BLDE (Deemed to be University) offers PhD curriculum under Faculty of Medicine and Faculty of Allied Health Sciences.

Library and information centre

Undergraduate courses
The college offers the four and a half-year M.B.B.S. course with a one-year compulsory rotating internship.

Postgraduate courses
The college offers both the postgraduate degree and diploma courses. The degree course is of three years duration whereas the diploma course is of two years.

Body Donation Association 
The main purpose of this association is to receive the donor's bodies for corneal transplantation to the blind, research purposes, study of organs by the undergraduate, post-graduate and research students. A regular yearly campaign is organized in the city to create awareness for the same.

Sports
The college has grounds and facilities for cricket, football, table tennis, volleyball, lawn tennis, hockey, badminton, athletics, and indoor games. The campus has a permanent sports ground on par with national standards and a gym.

Departments
General Medicine
General Surgery
Obstetrics and Gynaecology
Pediatrics
Orthopedics
Ophthalmology
ENT
Dermatology and Venereology
Psychiatry
Anaesthesia
Radiology
Nephrology
Neurology
Urology
Pulmonology
Neurosurgery
Laparoscopic surgery
Gastroenterology
Plastic Surgery
Pediatric Surgery

Additional facilities / features:

 Ayurveda
 Speech and hearing center
 Clinical Psychologist
 clinical pharmacy
 Medico Social Work
 Regional Blood Bank
 Artificial limb Center
 Naturopathy
 Vertigo Clinic
 Headache Clinic
 Head & Neck Cancer Clinic
 Epilepsy Clinic
 Child Guidance Clinic
 Sexual Health Clinic
 Pigmentry Clinic
 Cancer detection Clinic
 Infertility Clinic
 Immunization
 HIV Counseling
 Diabetics
 Hand Surgery
 Laboratory of Vascular Physiology and Medicine<https://bldedu.ac.in/laboratory-of-vascular-physiology-and-medicine/>
 Centre for Advanced Medical Research

Operation Theatre Complex
The college is equipped with the 14 operating tables in the same premises having conducted 50,470 major and minor surgeries.

Multi specialty surgeries
Kidney transplantation and corneal transplantation are conducted in the hospital.

References

External links 
Official Website

Hospitals in Karnataka
Medical colleges in Karnataka
Universities and colleges in Bijapur district
1980 establishments in Karnataka
Educational institutions established in 1980
Hospitals established in 1986